Thierry Godard (born 8 February 1967) is a French actor. He has appeared in more than fifty films since 2001.

Early life
Godard was born on 8 February 1967 in Issy-les-Moulineaux, France. After finishing school, he earned a cabinetmaking diploma before turning to theater.  Godard trained at the studio Pygmalion in Paris where he participated in workshops taught by Robert Cordier.

Career
He took his first steps as an actor on television in 1999 in the series Lawyers and Associates, appearing as the journalist, then in L'Enfant éternel in 2002. Three years later, he became known to the general public thanks to his role of Lieutenant "Gilou" in the series Engrenages (Spiral) then through the series Un village français where, from 2009-17, he played the character of Raymond Schwartz.

Personal life
The actor has a son, Lino, from his relationship with Sandrine Degraef.  In 2017, his companion Blanche Veisberg died suddenly from cancer. The same year, on the shooting of the TV movie Remember us, he met the actress Sophie Guillemin. The couple were married in August 2018.

Film

Filmography

References

External links 

1967 births
Living people
French male film actors